WPBV-LP (98.3 FM) is a radio station licensed to serve the community of Palm Beach, Florida. The station is owned by Coastal Frequencies Inc., and airs a Catholic radio format, including programming from EWTN Radio.

The station was assigned the WPBV-LP call letters by the Federal Communications Commission on January 30, 2015.

References

External links
 Official Website
 
 FCC Public Inspection File for WPBV-LP

PBV-LP
Radio stations established in 2015
2015 establishments in Florida
PBV-LP
Palm Beach County, Florida